KORS-CD, virtual and UHF digital channel 16, is a low-powered, Class A television station licensed to Portland, Oregon, United States.

Logos

See also
 KOXI-CD
 KORK-CD
 KOXO-CD
 KKEI-CD

External links
 WatchTV, Inc.

ORS-CD
Mass media in Salem, Oregon
Television channels and stations established in 1997
1997 establishments in Oregon
Low-power television stations in the United States